Counter-cyclical payment (CCP) — Under the Direct and Counter-cyclical Program (DCP) created by the 2002 farm bill (P.L. 101-171, Sec. 1101-1108), counter-cyclical payments are made to participating producers when the marketing year average price received by farmers for a covered commodity is less than the target price.  The total payment to a producer is the payment acres (85% of base acres) times the payment rate (target price minus average market price, except not more than the difference between the target price and the sum of the national loan rate and the direct payment rate).

References 

United States Department of Agriculture
Agricultural subsidies